Mustafa Mahdi Bassas (born 25 June 1993) is a Saudi professional footballer who last played for Pro League club Al-Faisaly as a winger.

Club career

Early years
Mustafa began and spent all of his career to date with Al-Ahli. He played for the Al-Ahli academy junior and youth teams. Bassas plays in more than one position: right back, central midfielder, attacking midfielder, winger,  and second striker. He is known for his pace, shot power, and leadership skills. Czech coach Karel Jarolím gave him his debut in the Al-Ahli first team.

2012–present
On 7 October 2012, he played his first game with the senior team against Najran club in 2012–13 Saudi Professional League.

In the 2012 AFC Champions League, Bassas played in his first rivalry match in Jeddah against Ittihad, proving to be best player on the pitch, showing a lot of skill and talent when on the ball even though his side lost the first leg 1-0. The second leg, however, was won by Al-Ahli 2-0, with Bassas producing a man of the match display with an assist to Victor Simões, who also scored the second goal in the 83rd minute and to help the team qualify for the final against eventual winners Ulsan Hyundai. Al-Bassas helped Al-Ahli in obtaining Saudi Federation Cup 2012-13.
Al-Ahli fans chose Al-Bassas as Player of the Season in 2012-13.

Al-Bassas has played 10 matches and scored 4 goals in the 2013 AFC Champions League. His 4 goals were against Al-Gharafa, He scored twice against Sepahan and once against El-Jaish. Al-Bassas has played 19 matches in the 2012–13 Saudi Professional League this season and scored 5 goals.

International career
Bassas made his debut in the Saudi Arabia national team against Argentina and the result was a draw.

Sponsorship
In 2013, Al-Bassas is featured, alongside Lionel Messi, on the official cover of the video game FIFA 14 as distributed for the Middle East for all platforms except the Wii and Nintendo 3DS versions. He did not appear on the PlayStation 4 and Xbox One versions of the game either, although those versions featured a revised cover.

Career statistics

Club

International
Statistics accurate as of match played 10 September 2019.

Honours

Club
Al-Ahli
Saudi Professional League: 2015–16
King Cup : 2016
Saudi Crown Prince Cup : 2014–15
Saudi Super Cup: 2016
Saudi Federation Cup: 2012–13
AFC Champions League Runner-up: 2012

Al-Faisaly
King Cup : 2020–21

International
Saudi Arabia U-23
Under 23 Gulf Cup of Nations: 2012

Individual
Under 23 Gulf Cup of Nations most valuable player: 2012
Al-Ahli player of the season: 2012–13

References

External links

Mustafa Al-Bassas at Goal.com

1993 births
Living people
Sportspeople from Jeddah
Saudi Arabian footballers
Saudi Arabia international footballers
Al-Ahli Saudi FC players
Ohod Club players
Al-Faisaly FC players
2015 AFC Asian Cup players
Association football midfielders
Saudi Arabia youth international footballers
Saudi Professional League players